The Windmill is a 1937 British drama film directed by Arthur B. Woods and starring Hugh Williams, Glen Alyn and Henry Mollison. It was based on a novel by John Drabble.

Premise
During the First World War, the German adopted daughter of a Belgian innkeeper tries to balance her loyalty to her father, who is a spy for the Germans, and her love for a British soldier billetted in their inn.

Cast
 Hugh Williams ...  Lt. Peter Ellington
 Glen Alyn ...  Clodine Asticot
 Henry Mollison ...  Gaston Lefarge
 Anthony Shaw ...  Colonel Richardson
 George Galleon ...  Major Arbuthnot
 William Dewhurst ...  Mons. Asticot
 Winifred Oughton ...  Mme. Asticot
 John Laurie ...  Mons. Coutard
 John Carol ...  Pvt. Goggie
 Bruce Lester ...  Officer

References

External links

1937 films
1937 drama films
1930s English-language films
Films directed by Arthur B. Woods
British drama films
British black-and-white films
1930s British films